Operation Meghdoot ( "Operation Cloud Messenger" after a famous Sanskrit poem by Kalidasa) was the codename for the Indian Armed Forces' operation to seize control of the Siachen Glacier in the then state of Jammu and Kashmir (now in Ladakh), precipitating the Siachen conflict. Executed in the morning of 13 April 1984 in the highest battlefield in the world, Meghdoot was the first military offensive of its kind. The operation preempted Pakistan's impending Operation Ababeel (which was intended to achieve the same objective as Meghdoot) and was a success, resulting in Indian forces gaining control of the Siachen Glacier in its entirety.

Currently, the Indian Army remains the first and only army in the world to have taken tanks and other heavy ordnance up to such an altitude (well over ). Up to ten infantry battalions each of the Indian Army and Pakistan Army are actively deployed at high altitudes of up to  throughout the region of the glacier.

The operation

Cause of conflict

The Siachen Glacier became a bone of contention following a vague demarcation of territories in the Karachi Agreement of July 1949 which did not exactly specify who had authority over the Siachen Glacier area. Indian interpretation was that Pakistan territory extended only to about the Saltoro Ridge based on the Simla agreement where the territorial line's route after the last demarcated Point NJ9842 was "thence north to the glaciers." Pakistan interpretation was that their territory continued northeast from Point NJ9842 to the Karakoram Pass. As a result, both nations claimed the barren heights and the Siachen Glacier. In the 1970s and early 1980s, Pakistan permitted several mountaineering expeditions to climb the peaks in the Siachen region from the Pakistani side, perhaps in an attempt to reinforce their claim on the area as these expeditions received permits obtained from the Government of Pakistan and in many cases a liaison officer from the Pakistan Army accompanied the teams. In 1978, the Indian Army also allowed mountaineering expeditions to the glacier, approaching from its side. The most notable one was the one launched by Colonel Narinder "Bull" Kumar of the Indian Army, who led an expedition to Teram Kangri, along with medical officer Captain A.V.S. Gupta. The Indian Air Force provided valuable support to this expedition in 1978 through logistic support and supply of fresh rations. The first air landing on the glacier was carried out on 6 October 1978 when two casualties were evacuated from the Advance Base Camp in a Chetak helicopter by Sqn Ldr Monga and Flying Officer Manmohan Bahadur. Contention over the glacier was aggravated by these expeditions, through both sides asserting their claims.

Notably, when Pakistan gave permission to a Japanese expedition to scale an important peak (Rimo I) in 1984, it further fueled the suspicion of the Indian Government of Pakistani attempts to legitimize their claim. The peak, located east of the Siachen Glacier, also overlooks the northwestern areas of the Aksai Chin area which is controlled by China but claimed by India. The Indian military believed that such an expedition could further a link for a trade route from the northeastern (Chinese) to the southwestern (Pakistani) side of the Karakoram Range and eventually provide a strategic, if not tactical, advantage to the Pakistani Armed Forces.

Planning

The Indian military decided to deploy troops from Northern Ladakh region as well as some paramilitary forces to the glacier area. Most of the troops had been acclimatized to the extremities of the glacier through a training expedition to Antarctica in 1982 before eventually launching the operation to occupy the complete glacier. In 1983, Pakistani generals decided to stake their claim through troop deployments to the Siachen glacier. After analysing the Indian Army's mountaineering expeditions, they feared that India might capture key ridges and passes near the glacier, and decided to send their own troops first. Islamabad ordered Arctic-weather gear from a London supplier, unaware that the same supplier provided outfits to the Indians. The Indians were informed about this development and initiated their own plan, providing them with a head start.

The Indian Army planned an operation to control the glacier by 13 April 1984, to preempt the Pakistani Army by about 4 days, as intelligence had reported that the Pakistani operation planned to occupy the glacier by 17 April. Named for the divine cloud messenger, Meghaduta, from the 4th century AD Sanskrit play by Kalidasa, Operation Meghdoot was led by Lieutenant General Prem Nath Hoon. The task of occupying the Saltoro ridge was given to 26 Sector, commanded by Brigadier Vijay Channa, who was tasked with launching the operation between 10 and 30 April. He chose 13 April, supposedly a lucky date, because it was the Vaisakhi day, when the Pakistanis would be least expecting the Indians to launch an operation.

Preparations for Operation Meghdoot started with the airlift of Indian Army soldiers by the Indian Air Force. The Air Force used Il-76, An-12 and An-32 to transport stores and troops as well to airdrop supplies to high altitude airfields. From there Mi-17, Mi-8 and HAL Chetak helicopters carried provisions and personnel to the east of the hitherto unscaled peaks.

Execution 

The first phase of the operation began in March 1984 with the march on foot to the eastern base of the glacier. A full battalion of the Kumaon Regiment and units from the Ladakh Scouts, marched with full battle packs through an ice-bound Zoji La pass for days. The units under the command of Lieutenant-Colonel (later Brigadier) D. K. Khanna were moved on foot to avoid detection of large troop movements by Pakistani radars.

The first unit—tasked with establishing a position on the heights of the glacier—was led by Major (later Lieutenant-Colonel) R. S. Sandhu. The next unit led by Captain Sanjay Kulkarni secured Bilafond La. The remaining forward deployment units then marched and climbed for four days under the command of Captain P. V. Yadav to secure the remaining heights of the Saltoro Ridge. By 13 April, approximately 300 Indian troops were dug into the critical peaks and passes of the glacier. By the time Pakistan troops managed to get into the immediate area, they found that the Indian troops had controlled all three major mountain passes of Sia La, Bilafond La, and by 1987 Gyong La and all the commanding heights of the Saltoro Ridge west of the Siachen Glacier. Handicapped by the altitude and the limited time, Pakistan could only manage to control the Saltoro Ridge's western slopes and foothills despite the fact that Pakistan possessed more ground accessible routes to the area, unlike Indian access which was largely reliant on air drops for supplies due to the steeper eastern side of the glacier.

In his memoirs, former Pakistani president, General Pervez Musharraf states that Pakistan lost  of territory. Time magazine also states that the Indian advance captured  of territory claimed by Pakistan. Camps were soon converted to permanent posts by both countries. The number of casualties on both sides during this particular operation is not known.

Casualties 

No reliable data is available.  However, both sides incurred most of their casualties from the weather and the terrain. A large number of soldiers from both sides suffered frostbite and high altitude sickness or were lost in avalanches or crevasses during patrols.

In Siachen Glacier Operation Meghdoot, from 1984 till 18 November 2016, 35 officers and 887 JCOs / ORs have lost their lives. This information was given by Minister of State for Defence Dr. Subhash Bhamre in a written reply to Majeed Memon in Rajya Sabha.

Aftermath 

The AGPL runs roughly along the Saltoro Mountains from Point NJ9842 on the India-Pakistan LoC to near La Yongma Ri, Gyong La, Gyong Kangri, Chumik Kangri, Bilafond La (pass) and nearby Bana Post, Saltoro Kangri,  Ghent Kangri, and Sia La to the India–Pakistan–China trijunction northwest of Indira Col West on the Sino-Indian LAC. The peaks and passes under Pakistan's control such as Gayari Camp, Chogolisa, Baltoro Glacier, Conway Saddle, Baltoro Muztagh, and Gasherbrum lie west of the AGPL.

The operation and the continued cost of maintaining logistics to the area is a major drain on both militaries. Pakistan launched an all-out assault in 1987 and again in 1989 to capture the ridge and passes held by India. The first assault was headed by then-Brigadier-General Pervez Musharraf (later President of Pakistan) and initially managed to capture a few high points before being pushed back. Later the same year, Pakistan lost at least one major Pakistani post, the "Quaid", which came under Indian control as Bana Post, in recognition of Bana Singh who launched a daring daylight attack, codenamed Operation Rajiv, after climbing  of ice cliff. Bana Singh was awarded the Param Vir Chakra (PVC) – the highest gallantry award of India for the assault that captured the post. The second assault in 1989 was also unsuccessful as the ground positions did not change. The loss of most of the Siachen area and the subsequent unsuccessful military forays prompted Benazir Bhutto to taunt Zia ul Haq that he should wear a burqa as he had lost his manliness.

In popular media
Operation Meghdoot: How India Captured Siachen (Battle Ops) (2018) is a TV documentary which premièred on the Discovery Channel's Veer by Discovery series, Battle Ops.

See also

 Near the AGPL (Actual Ground Position Line)
 NJ9842 LoC ends and AGPL begins
 Gyong La
 Chumik Glacier
 Saltoro Mountains
 Saltoro Kangri
 Ghent Kangri
 Bilafond La
 Sia La
 Indira Col

 Borders
 Actual Ground Position Line (AGPL)
 India–Pakistan International Border (IB)
 Line of Control (LoC)
 Line of Actual Control (LAC)
 Sir Creek (SC)
 Borders of China
 Borders of India
 Borders of Pakistan

 Conflicts
 Kashmir conflict
 Siachen conflict
 Sino-Indian conflict
 List of disputed territories of China
 List of disputed territories of India
 List of disputed territories of Pakistan
 Northern Areas
 Trans-Karakoram Tract

 Operations
 Operation Rajiv, by India
 Operation Safed Sagar, by India

 Other related topics
 Awards and decorations of the Indian Armed Forces
 Bana Singh, after whom Quaid Post was renamed to Bana Top 
 Dafdar, westernmost town in Trans-Karakoram Tract
 India-China Border Roads
 List of extreme points of India
 Sino-Pakistan Agreement for transfer of Trans-Karakoram Tract to China

References

External links
 Defence India
 Indian Air Force
 Gen. Mehta on Kargil and Siachen - Rediff.com
 Siachen disengagement - Article in Daily Times
 War at the top of the World - Article in TIME.
 The buildup to Operation Meghdoot by Wing Commander M. Bahadur

Meghdoot
Meghdoot
Siachen conflict
1984 in India
1984 in Pakistan
Meghdoot
April 1984 events in Asia
Invasions by India